Stichopus herrmanni, or Herrmann's sea cucumber, is a species of holothuroidean echinoderm in the family Stichopodidae. This and several other species are known as curryfish and are harvested commercially; it is called gama in Indonesia.

Description
The body is cylindrical with  a flat sole. The body wall is rough and wrinkled, without large swellings but with orange-brown papillae (conical fleshy protuberances). The mouth is surrounded by eight to sixteen feeding tentacles and the sole bears short tube feet. The colour is variable, in some locations being greyish-brown, greenish-brown, or sandy-brown, while in others being mustard-yellow, orange-brown or green and brown.

Distribution and habitat
Stichopus herrmanni is found in the tropical west Indo-Pacific region. Its range extends from the east coast of Africa to Malaysia, Indonesia and Australia.

Uses
There is a commercial fishery for this species in Indonesia and northern Australia. It is known as "curryfish", but this name encompasses several species, S. herrmanni, Stichopus vastus and Stichopus ocellatus and landings of the three species are recorded as one. At one time, this species was not harvested because the flesh easily disintegrated, but modern processing methods provide better handling and it has now become a high value product.

Status
Although the population of S. herrmanni is stable in Australia, elsewhere fishing pressure is causing declines in its populations over most of its range. As a result of overfishing of more desirable species, this species is likely to face greater exploitation, and the International Union for Conservation of Nature has assessed its conservation status as "vulnerable".

See also
Sea cucumber as food

References

External links
 

Stichopodidae
Animals described in 1868
Fauna of the Indian Ocean
Fauna of the Pacific Ocean